Pozezdrze  is a village in Węgorzewo County, Warmian-Masurian Voivodeship, in northern Poland. It is the seat of the gmina (administrative district) called Gmina Pozezdrze.

The village has a population of 1,320.

References

Villages in Węgorzewo County